Sarısaltık is a village in the Hozat District, Tunceli Province, Turkey. The village is populated by Kurds of the Bahtiyar tribe and had a population of 57 in 2021.

The hamlets of Akören, Akseki, Amaçlı, Derindere, Işıklar, Köybaşı, Maşa and Salkımlı are attached to the village.

References 

Kurdish settlements in Tunceli Province
Villages in Hozat District